Jafarabad (also Romanized as Ja‘farābād; also known as Ja’far Abad Bahabad) is a village in Jolgeh Rural District, in the Central District of Behabad County, Yazd Province, Iran. At the 2006 census, its population was 104, in 31 families.

References 

Populated places in Behabad County